Jamesia americana, also called cliffbush, waxflower or five petal cliffbush, is a species of flowering plant in the Hydrangeaceae.

Description
Jamesia americana is a perennial shrub distributed throughout the Sierra Nevada and Rocky Mountains. It is distinguished from the similar Jamesia tetrapetala in that J. americana has many flower heads with five petals.

Systematics
There are several varieties of Jamesia americana. These include:
Jamesia americana var. americana
Jamesia americana var. macrocalyx
Jamesia americana var. rosea
Jamesia americana var. zionis

References

Hydrangeaceae